Pinoglyphus is a genus of mites in the family Acaridae.

Species
 Pinoglyphus cetus Mahunka, 1979
 Pinoglyphus pilosus Mahunka, 1979
 Pinoglyphus rettenmeyeri S. Mahunka, 1978

References

Acaridae